Moryké Fofana (born 23 November 1991) is an Ivorian professional footballer who plays for Samsunspor as a winger.

Career
Fofana started his career at École de Football Yéo Martial. Ahead of the 2012 season, he signed for Lillestrøm. He made his debut for Lillestrøm in a 1–0 loss to Sogndal on 7 October 2012.

In July 2015, Fofana moved to French Ligue 1 side FC Lorient on a four-year contract.

In January 2017, he signed a 2.5-year contract with Turkish club Konyaspor.

In June 2019, he signed a contract with Turkish club Yeni Malatyaspor. In August 2021, Fofana signed with TFF First League club Samsunspor.

Career statistics

Honours
Konyaspor
 Turkish Cup: 2016–17
 Turkish Super Cup: 2017

References

1991 births
Living people
People from Grand-Bassam
Association football wingers
Ivorian footballers
Ivorian expatriate footballers
Lillestrøm SK players
FC Lorient players
Konyaspor footballers
Yeni Malatyaspor footballers
Samsunspor footballers
Eliteserien players
Ligue 1 players
Süper Lig players
Expatriate footballers in Norway
Ivorian expatriate sportspeople in Norway
Expatriate footballers in France
Ivorian expatriate sportspeople in France
Expatriate footballers in Turkey
Ivorian expatriate sportspeople in Turkey